Jade Rhodes is a former collegiate All-American, right-handed professional All-Star softball player, originally from Sarasota, Florida. Rhodes played for the Auburn Tigers of the Southeastern Conference from 2013 to 2016 as a third baseman and first baseman and ranks in career home runs for the school. She helped the Tigers to a second-place finish at the 2016 Women's College World Series and was named All-Tournament. Although undrafted, Rhodes went on to play in the National Pro Fastpitch from 2016 to 2019 and won a title in 2017 with the Scrap Yard Dawgs.

High school career
In 2012, she was named the Sarasota Herald Tribune Softball Player of the Year for Sarasota High School.

College career
Rhodes was an All-American for the Auburn Tigers.

Professional career
For the 2018 National Pro Fastpitch season, while playing for the Cleveland Comets, Rhodes won the Rawlings Gold Glove Award as the league's top fielder.

Coaching career
Previously an assistant coach at Eastern New Mexico University, Rhodes is now an assistant coach for Oklahoma Baptist University.

Statistics

External links

References

American softball players
Living people
Cleveland Comets players
Softball players from Florida
Year of birth missing (living people)
Auburn Tigers softball players
Eastern New Mexico Greyhounds
Oklahoma Baptist Bison